Halimede can refer to: 

Halimede, one of the Nereids
Halimede (moon), one of the outer moons of Neptune
Halimede (crab), a genus of crab